Carl Lawson (born 27 October 1947) is a Jamaican former sprinter.

References

1947 births
Living people
Jamaican male sprinters
Commonwealth Games gold medallists for Jamaica
Athletes (track and field) at the 1970 British Commonwealth Games
Athletes (track and field) at the 1974 British Commonwealth Games
Athletes (track and field) at the 1971 Pan American Games
Commonwealth Games medallists in athletics
Pan American Games medalists in athletics (track and field)
Pan American Games gold medalists for Jamaica
Medalists at the 1971 Pan American Games
20th-century Jamaican people
21st-century Jamaican people
Medallists at the 1970 British Commonwealth Games